Chickasaw City Schools (CCS) is a school district in Alabama, serving Chickasaw.

The city voted to form its own school system in 2012. Previously it was a part of the Mobile County Public School System.

Chickasaw Elementary School and Chickasaw High School serve the city.

References

External links

Chickasaw City Schools

School districts in Alabama
Education in Mobile County, Alabama
2012 establishments in Alabama
School districts established in 2012